Ghara is an earthen pot made in India and Pakistan.

Ghara may also refer to:

Ghara, Nepal, a village in the Myagdi district, Annapurna R.M of Nepal
Ghara Balooch, an administrative unit of Tank District, Khyber Pakhtunkhwa province, Pakistan

See also
Qara (disambiguation)